Maguwo Station (MGW) is a Class II airport railway station located in Maguwoharjo, Depok, Sleman Regency, Special Region of Yogyakarta, Indonesia. The station, which is located at an altitude of +118 meters, is included in the Operational Region VI Yogyakarta. It is the eastern and northernmost active station in Special Region of Yogyakarta, as well as the first airport railway station in Indonesia as it is located in front of Adisutjipto International Airport. Currently it has four railway tracks with lines 2 and 3 being straight lines.

To the east of this station, before Brambanan Station, there was Kalasan Station which has been inactive since the operation of Kutoarjo–Solo Balapan double-track line.

To support the double track operation on this route, the mechanical signaling system at this station was replaced with an electric signaling system by PT Len Industri (Persero) which had been installed since 2013 and then began operating on 1 October 2018.

History

According to the 2004 KAI railway timetable (Gapeka), the old Maguwo Station has four railway tracks with line 2 being a straight line. There are four badug tracks (two connect on line 1 and the rest connect on line 4). The badug track on line 4 was previously used for Pertamina's avtur boiler train for the –Maguwo, while the badug track on line 1 was used for the landing and storage of the Pupuk Sriwidjaya Palembang train, whose warehouse is to the west of the station. During the days of switching to multiple lines, this station remained in use.

With the completion of the Yogyakarta-Solo double track and due to the construction of a suitable Adisucipto Airport, a new Maguwo Station was built which is a few hundred meters to the east to facilitate access for passengers to and from the airport. The new Maguwo Station started to be tried on 2 June 2008. Once tested, a few months later the old Maguwo Station building was officially closed and made a cultural heritage by the Center for Conservation and Architectural Design Unit of PT KAI because it has historical value and has participated in the film Janur Kuning (1979).

Starting in March 2015, the line in front of the old Maguwo Station will be used as a transfer for the Palembang Pusri fertilizer to the warehouse located west of the old Maguwo Station. Another destination is to Gombong and Ceper Station and transported from Cilacap Station.

Facilities
The station is now equipped with an underground line that connects aircraft passengers directly from the station. On the front yard, there are also functioning bus stops for the inner-city transportation system Trans Jogja.

Services
Maguwo station is only serves KRL Commuterline Yogyakarta–Solo, to Yogyakarta and to Palur.

The station has bus connection through Bandara Adisutjipto bus stop of Trans Jogja, serves Lines 1A, 1B, 3A, 3B, 5B, and K3-Teman Bus.

References

External links

Sleman Regency
Railway stations in Yogyakarta
Airport railway stations in Indonesia
Railway stations opened in 1872